The city of Hood River is the seat of Hood River County, Oregon, United States. It is a port on the Columbia River, and is named for the nearby Hood River. As of the 2020 census, the city population was 8,313. It is the only city in Oregon where public consumption of alcohol on sidewalks or parks is totally unrestricted.

History 
Hood River (originally called Dog River) post office was established (named by Mary Coe) at the site of the present city on September 30, 1868,
and the city itself was incorporated in 1895.  Originally, the city was part of Wasco County, but it became the seat of Hood River County when the county was first established in 1908.

The Hood River Incident 
The Hood River incident involved the removal of sixteen Nisei servicemen's names from the county "roll of honor" in Hood River, Oregon, by the local American Legion Post 22. The incident, on November 29, 1944, was part of a string of anti-Japanese actions taken in an attempt to prevent removed Japanese Americans from returning to the area after their release from internment by the United States federal government. National outrage against the community heightened five weeks later when a local Japanese American serviceman died after completing a heroic mission in the Philippines. Under great pressure, the local American Legion post restored Nisei names to the wall of the county courthouse on April 29, 1945.

Geography 
Hood River is at the confluence of the Hood River and the Columbia River in the heart of the Columbia River Gorge. It is across the Columbia River from White Salmon, Washington. South of the city is the Hood River Valley, known for its production of apples, pears, and cherries.

Climate
Located at the transition zone between wet temperate rainforest to the west, and dry shrub-steppe desert to the east, Hood River has a moderate climate with rainy winters and warm summers (Köppen: Csb), although rainfall there is somewhat less than Portland and other nearby areas in the Willamette Valley. The area is known for its consistently high winds channeling down the Columbia River Gorge.

Temperatures for the year as a whole are slightly cooler than in most other low-elevation towns in the region, especially at night because of air drainage off the surrounding mountains.

Demographics

2010 census
As of the census of 2010, there were 7,167 people, 2,972 households, and 1,728 families residing in the city. The racial makeup of the city was:
86.9% White 
24.4% Hispanic or Latino, 
0.5% African American, 
0.6% Native American, 
1.5% Asian, 0.1% Pacific Islander, 
7.4% from other races, and 
3.0% from two or more races.

There were 2,972 households, of which 33.8% had children under the age of 18 living with them, 43.2% were married couples living together, 11.0% had a female householder with no husband present, 4.0% had a male householder with no wife present, and 41.9% were non-families. 33.4% of all households were made up of individuals, and 13.8% had someone living alone who was 65 years of age or older. The average household size was 2.39 and the average family size was 3.12.

The median age in the city was 36.3 years. 25.9% of residents were under the age of 18; 7.3% were between the ages of 18 and 24; 30.6% were from 25 to 44; 23.5% were from 45 to 64; and 12.7% were 65 years of age or older. The gender makeup of the city was 47.9% male and 52.1% female.

2000 census
As of the census of 2000, there were 5,831 people, 2,429 households, and 1,442 families residing in the city. The population density was 2,839.4 people per square mile (1,098.2 per km). There were 2,645 housing units at an average density of 1,288.0 per square mile (498.2 per km). The racial makeup of the city was:

57.66% White
23.17% Hispanic or Latino
1.15% Asian
0.99% Native American
0.60% African American
0.19% Pacific Islander
13.58% from other races
2.66% from two or more races.

There were 2,429 households, of which 32.3% had children under the age of 18 living with them, 44.1% were married couples living together, 11.6% had a female householder with no husband present, and 40.6% were non-families. 32.8% of all households were made up of individuals, and 14.8% had someone living alone who was 65 years of age or older. The average household size was 2.38 and the average family size was 3.06.

In the city, the population was spread out, with:
26.2% under the age of 18
9.7% from 18 to 24
32.6% from 25 to 44
18.5% from 45 to 64
13.1% 65 years of age or older.

The median age was 34 years. For every 100 females, there were 88.6 males. For every 100 females age 18 and over, there were 87.7 males.

The median income for a household in the city was $31,580, and the median income for a family was $35,568. Males had a median income of $31,583 versus $24,764 for females. The per capita income for the city was $17,609. About 12.1% of families and 17.3% of the population were below the poverty line, including 28.7% of those under age 18 and 14.3% of those age 65 or over.

Economy 

Hood River's economy has traditionally been based on three industries: agriculture, tourism, and sports recreation, but since the late 1990s, high-tech industries, such as aerospace engineering (e.g. Insitu and Hood Technologies), have become some of the largest employers. Long an agricultural center of the Pacific Northwest, Hood River historically was a hub of logging exports and fruit tree orchards.  While lumber was the primary export for Hood River throughout most of its history, with the advent of forest protection measures such as the establishment of the Columbia River Gorge National Scenic Area, Hood River has exchanged most of its former tree cutting agricultural ways to focus more heavily on its apple and pear orchards as well as many wineries. Many of these local orchards and wineries, including Hood River-based The Fruit Company, are featured on Hood River's renowned "Fruit Loop".

Hood River first experienced a boom in tourism after being discovered as a site for world-class windsurfing, and more recently kiteboarding. Hood River County also has some of the best kayaking, mountain biking, downhill and Nordic skiing, and hiking areas in the United States.

Situated in the Columbia Gorge, and surrounded by fields, orchards, vineyards, and at the foot of Mount Hood, Hood River is a popular tourist destination.

All of these factors have led to coverage and acclaim in publications such as National Geographic Adventure, Sunset, Outside, Backpacker, Smithsonian, the New York Times travel section, and others. Hood River has received numerous awards from national magazines, such as "coolest small town" to "fifth best ski-town in America". Most recently, Hood River was featured on CNN as one of "11 great riverfront towns" in the United States.

Other industries in the city include Hood River Distillers, Full Sail Brewing Company, and vegetarian food manufacturer Turtle Island Foods, producer of Tofurky. The Hood River Valley is also home to more than a dozen wineries.

Arts and culture

Situated against a backdrop of the spectacular Cascade Mountains and the Columbia River Gorge National Scenic Area, Hood River has become a creative incubator and world-class arts destination, home to a notable concentration of visual and performing artists, writers, design professionals, business creatives, and culinary establishments. In 2018, Hood River was listed as the number four small city in the Arts Vibrancy Index, released by the National Center for Arts Research at Southern Methodist University.

Among the arts organizations in the city is the Performing Arts Initiative, a non-profit group founded in 2016 with the goal of "building a state of the art performing arts center" in the Columbia River Gorge. The group's chair, Mark Steighner, was the musical director of Hood River Valley High School before retiring to head the PAI.

Also based in Hood River is the Columbia Gorge Orchestra Association (CGOA), a non-profit organization that includes six ensembles. The CGOA initially consisted solely of the Mid-Columbia Sinfonietta, which began performing in 1977 in conjunction with the Chamber Music Society of Oregon. The association was formed in 2004, adding two choirs, a jazz collective, a string quartet, and a theater group throughout the next ten years.

A small town with good walkability, Hood River is home to a public art walking tour and six diverse art galleries all within the small 'downtown' area. BIG ART, the public art walking tour hosted by Art of Community (established in 2014), periodically rotates sculptures and other outdoor art installations throughout the town.

Hood River's First Friday Art Walk is a grassroots creative movement to have a regularly coinciding event celebrating the vibrant art, culture, and community in the heart of Hood River. On the first Friday of each month, many of the town's galleries and businesses stay open after hours, meeting the flow of visitors to myriad microbreweries and wine tasting rooms with art openings, live music, art talks, demos, and more.

Many local artists also participate in the Gorge Artists Open Studios Tour, an annual self-guided tour of juried Columbia River Gorge artist studios, established in 2006, that occurs during Blossom Time. On the Tour weekend, artists open their private studios, sharing their work, thoughts, and processes with the public.

Hood River is also home to Columbia Center for the Arts, a community funded arts center that offers theatre, visual art, classes, and community events.

Culinary arts in Hood River include an abundance of microbreweries, wineries, cideries, and restaurants offering agricultural fare from the bounty of surrounding vineyards, orchards, and farms.

Annual events
Annual cultural events in the Hood River Valley include Hood River Valley Blossom Time and the Hood River Hard-Pressed Cider Fest, which take place in April, as well as the Hood River Hops Fest and the Hood River Valley Harvest Fest, both in October. In 2012, FoodandWine.com identified the Harvest Fest as one of the best harvest festivals in the United States.

The oldest swimming event on the Columbia River, the Roy Webster Cross-Channel Swim, takes place in Hood River every Labor Day. The event has been held nearly continuously since 1942, with the first cancellation occurring in 2017 due to the Eagle Creek Fire. The U.S. Windsurfing National Championships were held in Hood River in 2001, 2009, and 2012, and the Mount Hood Cycling Classic was held in the city from 2002 to 2013.

Museums and other points of interest

Hood River is home to the History Museum of Hood River County and the Western Antique Aeroplane & Automobile Museum; the International Museum of Carousel Art was also housed in the city until its closure in 2010. The city has over two dozen sites listed on the National Register of Historic Places (due in large part to the work of Sally Donovan, a local historian), including the Columbia Gorge Hotel, built in 1920 by Portland timber baron and Columbia Gorge booster Simon Benson.

The oldest house in the city is the Ezra L. Smith home, which he built in 1886 for his family. Smith was influential in state politics, in Oregon agricultural development, in Hood River city administration, and in banking. The house later served as a mortuary for over 40 years and is now the site of wine production and tastings for Stoltz Vineyards.

Parks and recreation
Hood River is the western gateway to the Mount Hood Scenic Byway and to a major section of the Historic Columbia River Highway. Hood River is considered a "sports mecca" and offers some of the best spots for windsurfing, kitesurfing, kayaking, standup paddleboarding, skiing and mountain biking—all for which it draws considerable national attention from many media outlets, such as the New York Times and National Geographic Adventure. The Port Commission has built a protected harbor for learning windsurfing called "The Hook". The city also features the family- and wind-sport–friendly Waterfront Park, a public pool, a skate park, biking trails, and several small public parks and ball fields. The valley is also home to two 18-hole golf courses. Further, the nation’s oldest volunteer search and rescue crew serving a mountain area, the Crag Rats, has its base in Hood River.

Education

Public primary and secondary schools in Hood River are part of the Hood River County School District.  Representing the change in town culture is the new garden, greenhouse and zero-energy music and science building at Hood River Middle School as part of the new Outdoor Classroom Project.  
The city is also served by an extension campus of Columbia Gorge Community College, based in The Dalles. Horizon Christian School is a private school serving grades kindergarten through twelfth grade (K–12). Horizon competes at the 1A level of the Oregon School Activities Association, while the public Hood River Valley High School competes at the 5A level. The city also is home to the Mid-Columbia Adventist School.

Media

Newspapers
The Columbia Gorge News is a weekly paper published on Wednesdays and serving Hood River, The Dalles, and White Salmon, Washington.

Radio
 KIHR AM 1340/98.3 FM
 KODL AM 1440/99.1 FM
 KQAC FM 88.1
 KMSW FM 92.7/102.9 
 KOPB-FM FM 94.3
 KZAS-LP FM 95.1 Radio Tierra
 KACI-FM 93.5 
 KCGB-FM 105.5/96.9

Television
 K34KE-D translator for KGW Portland, NBC affiliate
 K23OV-D translator for KOIN Portland, CBS affiliate
 CGN-7 Gorge TV

Magazines
Two locally published magazines serve the area. Columbia Gorge Magazine and The Gorge Magazine are monthly magazines featuring recreation, dining, shopping, weddings, architecture, arts and entertainment taking place in the Columbia Gorge area (primarily Hood River, The Dalles, and Troutdale).

Blogs 

 The Gorge is My Gym a weather blog by Temira Lital. 
 Hood River Eats a blog dedicated to keeping the community updated on the food scene. 
 Dishing Up the Dirt a food blog run by cookbook author and farmer Andrea Bemis.

Infrastructure

Transportation 
Air
Hood River has one airport, the Ken Jernstedt Airfield. It has no scheduled airline service and is for light general aviation use. However, Portland International Airport is a one-hour drive west from Hood River.

Highway
Interstate 84 and Oregon Route 35 pass through Hood River.

Rail
Hood River is the northern terminus of the Mount Hood Railroad, a heritage railway that offers passenger excursions from Hood River station and ships a small amount of freight. Union Pacific Railroad provides freight service to the city. The Union Pacific Railroad also had passenger service to Hood River for much of the 20th century, while Amtrak's Pioneer also served the city from 1977 to 1997 at Hood River station.

Bus
Hood River receives national bus service from Greyhound Lines. Additional bus service is provided to Portland, the Dalles, and Bingen by Columbia Area Transit and Mount Adams Transportation Service.

Marine
The Port of Hood River, founded in 1933, manages a public marina and waterfront economic development projects. The port commission also manages the airport and the Hood River-White Salmon Interstate Bridge.

Utilities
Water and wastewater treatment are supplied by the City of Hood River. Natural gas is provided by NW Natural and electricity by PacifiCorp.

Healthcare
Hood River has one hospital, Providence Hood River Memorial Hospital.

Notable people
 Cecil D. Andrus, politician, governor of Idaho
 Andrew Baldwin, professional baseball player
 Timothy K. Beal, religious scholar, author, professor
 Sammy Carlson, freeskier, X-Games medalist
 D. J. Conway, fantasy author
 Thomas R. Coon, strawberry farmer, politician and mayor of Hood River
 Sean FitzSimons, a participant in the 2022 winter games.
 Flor, alternative rock band signed to Fueled By Ramen
 Edward Hill, painter, poet, songwriter, newspaper correspondent
 George Hitchcock (1914–2010), poet, publisher
 Kenneth Jernstedt, fighter pilot in the Flying Tigers and politician
 Damon Knight, science fiction author
 Jeff Lahti, professional baseball player
 Marc Lee, United States Navy SEAL, first SEAL killed in the Global War on Terror
 Kim Peyton, swimmer, gold medalist at 1976 Olympic Games
 Marcus W. Robertson, war hero and Medal of Honor recipient
 Bob Smith, professional baseball player from 1957 to 1965
 Brooke Struck, television personality
 Suzanne VanOrman, politician
 Don Wakamatsu, professional baseball player and manager
 Greg Walden, politician
 Simeon R. Wilson, politician
 Minoru Yasui, lawyer, civil rights activist, Presidential Medal of Freedom recipient

Sister cities
Hood River has one sister city, as designated by Sister Cities International:
 Tsuruta, Japan

See also

 List of cities in Oregon

References

External links 

 City of Hood River (official website)
 Hood River County Chamber of Commerce
 Entry for Hood River in the Oregon Blue Book
 Hood River-area webcam from the KATU website

 
Cities in Oregon
County seats in Oregon
Cities in Hood River County, Oregon
Columbia River Gorge
Populated places established in 1858
Micropolitan areas of Oregon
Historic Columbia River Highway
Oregon populated places on the Columbia River
Port cities in Oregon
1858 establishments in Oregon Territory